Sretensk is the name of several inhabited localities in Russia.

Modern localities
Urban localities
Sretensk, a town in Sretensky District of Zabaykalsky Krai

Rural localities
Sretensk, Kirov Oblast, a selo in Perevozsky Rural Okrug of Nolinsky District in Kirov Oblast;

Alternative names
Sretensk, alternative name of Sretenskoye, a selo in Akhmanovsky Rural Okrug of Pizhansky District in Kirov Oblast;

See also
Sretensky, Russia (Sretenskoye, Sretenskaya), several rural localities in Russia